Diacranthera is a genus of flowering plants in the family Asteraceae.

 Species
All the known species are endemic to Brazil.
 Diacranthera crenata (Schltdl. ex Mart.) R.M.King & H.Rob. - Pernambuco, Bahia
 Diacranthera hebeclinia H.Rob. - Bahia
 Diacranthera ulei R.M.King & H.Rob. - Bahia, Ceará

References

Endemic flora of Brazil
Eupatorieae
Asteraceae genera